Rybarzowice  is a village in the administrative district of Gmina Buczkowice, within Bielsko County, Silesian Voivodeship, in southern Poland.

The village was first mentioned in a written document in 1581. It has a population of 3,448.

History 
The first mention of Ribarzowice comes from the conscript register of the Silesian poviat in 1581. In 1592, it was mentioned under the German name Fischendorf , which is related to the proximity of the Bielsko-Biała language island

In 1595 , the village, located in the Silesian poviat of the Krakow voivodship, was owned by the castellan of Nowy Sącz,

After the partitions, Rybarzowice found itself under Austrian rule becoming a part of the Kingdom of Galicia and Lodomeria . From 1867 within the borders of the Biała County According to the Austrian census of 1900, 223 buildings in Rybarzowice, on an area of 885 hectares ( gemeinde and gutsgebiete ), were inhabited by 1,536 people (population density 173.6 people/km²), of which 1,525 (99.3%) were Catholics and 11 (0 .7%) Jews , while 1,529 (99.5%) were Polish-speaking

World War 2 and 21st century 
During World War II, the village was incorporated into the Bielitz district in the Third Reich under the name of Fischersdorf,

In the years 1975–1998 , the town administratively belonged to the Bielsko Voivodeship.

References

Villages in Bielsko County